The 1937 Great Hong Kong Typhoon was an unnamed typhoon in Hong Kong on 2 September 1937. It was one of the deadliest typhoons in Hong Kong history killing 11,000 people. In Macau, 21 people died by this typhoon.

History

Victoria Harbour at the time was the seventh busiest in the world. It was always busy with sampans, junks, ferries, cargo ships, ocean liners, yachts and warships. The typhoon wind was so strong that observatory instruments capable of registering winds up to 125 mph broke down. Royal Observatory Hong Kong have since recorded the wind with a mean hourly wind average of 59 knots, 68 mph, 109 km/h, a 10-minute mean Wind of 74 knots, 85 mph, 137 km/h. The maximum gust was at 130 knots, 149 mph, 240 km/h. The typhoon was so powerful that it caused a  tidal wave that swept through the villages of Taipo and Shatin. The villages suffered massive damage and many fatalities.

The hurricane signal, equivalent to the hurricane signal number 10 in modern days in Hong Kong SAR, was hoisted a few hours prior to its closet approach at 15 km to the south-southwest of Hong Kong.

Other storms that hoisted the hurricane signal prior to 1946 include:
1884 Super typhoon - 11 September - 57kts - 106km/h max sustained hourly winds at the Royal Observatory in Tsim Sha Tsui, Hong Kong
1894 typhoon - 5 October - 54kts - 101km/h max sustained hourly winds at the Royal Observatory in Tsim Sha Tsui, Hong Kong
1896 Super typhoon - 29 to 30 July - 69kts - 128km/h max sustained hourly winds at the Royal Observatory in Tsim Sha Tsui, Hong Kong
1900 Geng-Zi typhoon disaster - 10 November - 61kts - 113km/h max sustained hourly winds at the Royal Observatory in Tsim Sha Tsui, Hong Kong. The strongest November typhoon to date, surpassing all typhoons in October. 
1906 Super Typhoon - Small but compact - 18 September - 50kts - 92km/h max sustained hourly winds at the Royal Observatory in Tsim Sha Tsui, Hong Kong. The typhoon appears to be comparable to  Typhoon Hope
1908 Typhoon - The storm was over Cheung Chau - 28 July - 52kts - 96km/h.
1923 Super Typhoon - The storm was over Aberdeen, Hong Kong Island at approximately 6 miles to the South of the Royal Observatory - 18 August - 67kts - 124km/h max sustained hourly winds at the Royal Observatory in Tsim Sha Tsui, Hong Kong. The typhoon appears to be comparable to  Typhoon Hope
1927 Severe Typhoon - 20 August - 53kts - 99km/h max sustained hourly winds at the Royal Observatory in Tsim Sha Tsui, Hong Kong
1929 Typhoon - 22 August - 57kts - 106km/h max sustained hourly winds at the Royal Observatory in Tsim Sha Tsui, Hong Kong. The typhoon appears to be comparable to  Typhoon York
1931 Super Typhoon - 1 August - 60kts - 112km/h max sustained hourly winds at the Royal Observatory in Tsim Sha Tsui, Hong Kong 
1936 Super Typhoon - 17 August - 62kts - 115km/h max sustained hourly winds at the Royal Observatory in Tsim Sha Tsui, Hong Kong

See also

Climate of Hong Kong
Economy of Hong Kong
Environment of Hong Kong
List of tropical cyclones

References

External links

 S. Campbell, "Typhoons affecting Hong Kong: Case Studies", Hong Kong University of Science and Technology, April 2005
 A Review of Natural Disasters of the Past

Pre-1940 Pacific typhoon seasons
1937 in Hong Kong
Typhoons in Hong Kong
1937 natural disasters
1937 meteorology